The Tour of Southland is a road bicycle racing stage race held in the Southland region of New Zealand.  From 2005 until 2009, the Tour of Southland has been part of the UCI Oceania Tour however the 2010 event was held as a National Tour. The Tour is held annually in November.  The race is organised and delivered by Cycling Southland. The race's title sponsor is SBS Bank, a New Zealand bank, which is the country's largest building society.

Multiple winners

List of winners

References

External links 
 Official Tour of Southland site
 Cycling Southland

Sport in Southland, New Zealand
Cycle races in New Zealand
Recurring sporting events established in 1956
UCI Oceania Tour races
1956 establishments in New Zealand
Spring (season) events in New Zealand